Ghulam Nabi Azad (born 7 March 1949) is an Indian politician who served as Leader of Opposition in Rajya Sabha between 2014 and 2021. He also served as the Chief Minister of erstwhile state of Jammu and Kashmir from 2005 to 2008. On 26 September 2022, Azad announced his own political party as Democratic Progressive Azad Party. He is the chief patron cum founder of Democratic Progressive Azad Party.

Azad served as Minister of Health and Family Welfare. He has served as the Minister of Parliamentary Affairs in the Manmohan Singh government until 27 October 2005, when he was appointed as the Chief Minister of Jammu and Kashmir. On 26 August 2022, Azad resigned from Indian National Congress and mulled creating a new party at the national level.

He also led the party successfully in the 2002 Assembly election in Jammu and Kashmir. He was bestowed with the Padma Bhushan, India's third highest civilian award, in 2022 by the Indian Government in the field of Public Affairs.

Early life
Ghulam Nabi Azad was born in a village named Soti of Gandoh tehsil (Bhalessa) in the formerly  princely state of Jammu and Kashmir's Doda district. His parents were Rahamatullah Batt and Basa Begum. He attended the local school in his village. Later for higher studies he moved to Jammu and received his Bachelor's of Science degree from G.G.M. Science College. Furthermore, he also received a Master's in Zoology degree from the University of Kashmir, Srinagar in 1972.

Political career
Azad started his career soon after working as the secretary for the Block Congress Committee in Bhalessa in 1973. Two years later, he was nominated as the President of the Jammu and Kashmir Pradesh Youth Congress. In 1980, he was appointed as the President of the All-India Youth Congress.

After being elected to the Seventh Lok Sabha from Maharashtra's Washim (Lok Sabha constituency) in 1980, Azad entered into the Central government as Deputy Minister in charge of Law, Justice and Company Affairs Ministry in 1982.

Subsequently, he was elected to the Eighth Lok Sabha in 1984 and was a member (1990 - 1996) from Maharashtra in Rajya Sabha. During Rao's government, Azad took charge of Parliamentary Affairs and Civil Aviation ministries. He was subsequently elected to Rajya Sabha from Jammu and Kashmir during the term of 30 November 1996 to 29 November 2002 and 30 November 2002 to 29 November 2008, but resigned on 29 April 2006 as he became Chief Minister of Jammu and Kashmir on 2 November 2005.

The People's Democratic Party, a coalition partner of the Indian National Congress in Jammu and Kashmir, withdrew its support for Azad's government, and rather than attempt to sustain his government by requesting a vote of confidence, Azad resigned on 7 July 2008, and later left office on 11 July 2008.

Union government

In the second United Progressive Alliance Government, led by Dr. Manmohan Singh, Mr. Azad, was sworn in as the Health Minister of India. He was elected to Rajya Sabha for fourth term and third term from Jammu and Kashmir during the term of 30 November 1996 to 29 November 2002. He vowed to expand the National Rural Health Mission, which has mobilized half a million health workers, all across India, and later his ministry also launched a National Urban Health Mission, to serve the slum dwelling urban poor.

He has suggested a late marriage age of between 25 and 30 for population control, and has said that lack of electricity & thereby absence of TV entertainment in rural areas will cause people to produce more children.

Leader of Opposition
In June 2014, after the National Democratic Alliance won a majority in the Lok Sabha and formed the Union government, Azad was appointed as the leader of opposition in the Rajya Sabha, where Congress still held the majority.

In 2015, Azad got re-elected to the Rajya Sabha from Jammu and Kashmir, despite the PDP-BJP alliance holding a majority of seats in the Legislative Assembly.

Resignation from INC
In August 2022, Azad resigned from the post of chairman of the Jammu and Kashmir Congress campaign committee hours after his appointment. Sonia Gandhi accepted the resignation from Azad. On 26 August 2022, he resigned from all positions including primary membership of the party. In his resignation letter, he cited destruction of consultative process by Rahul Gandhi as a reason.

New political party 

On 4 September 2022, Azad announced the formation of a new political party after resigning from Congress. He said the people of Jammu and Kashmir will decide the name and the flag for the new party.

On 26 September 2022, Azad announced the name of his new party as Democratic Azad Party. The flag of the Democratic Azad Party has three colours: mustard, white, and blue.

Personal life
Azad married Shameem Dev Azad, a well known Kashmiri singer, in 1980, and they have a son Saddam Nabi Azad and a daughter Sofiya Nabi Azad.

Positions held

Awards
In March 2022, Ghulam Nabi Azad received Padma Bhushan from President Ram Nath Kovind.
Outstanding Parliamentarian Award 2015, at Parliament House, New Delhi on August 1, 2018

References

Further reading
 Slippery slope, India Today, 14 November 2005.
 Ghulam Nabi Azad, India Today, 21 May 2009.

External links

 Ghulam Nabi Azad at Rajyasabha.nic.in

|-

|-

|-

1949 births
India MPs 1980–1984
India MPs 1984–1989
Chief Ministers of Jammu and Kashmir
Health ministers of India
Civil aviation ministers of India
20th-century Indian Muslims
21st-century Indian Muslims
Indian National Congress politicians from Jammu and Kashmir
Indian Youth Congress Presidents
Members of the Jammu and Kashmir Legislative Council
Kashmiri people
People from Doda district
Living people
Jammu and Kashmir MLAs 2002–2008
Lok Sabha members from Maharashtra
Members of the Cabinet of India
People from Washim district
Leaders of the Opposition in the Rajya Sabha
Chief ministers from Indian National Congress
Azad Gulab Nabi
Rajya Sabha members from Jammu and Kashmir
University of Kashmir alumni
University of Jammu alumni
Members of the National Cadet Corps (India)
People from Bhaderwah
Recipients of the Padma Bhushan in public affairs